Six Flags Over Texas consists of nine themed areas, including areas themed to Texas and different aspects of its culture, other nations, and Looney Tunes/DC characters. Rides are interspersed throughout these sections.

Areas and attractions

Roller coasters
, Six Flags Over Texas features 13 operating roller coasters, with one upcoming.

Star Mall
The area serves as the entry gate for Six Flags Over Texas. It was one of the original sections of the park when it opened in 1961. It is named for the large star-shaped fountain located in the section.

Mexico and Spain
The Mexico & Spain area consists of two sections both of which were originally part of the park in 1961. Both sections represent a flag that has flown over the state of Texas.

Texas
The Texas section of the park was another original section when the park opened in 1961. It is named after the Republic of Texas flag that once flew over the state.

Old South and France
The Old South & France area consists of two sections both of which were originally part of the park in 1961. Both sections represent a flag that has flown over the state of Texas. The Old South was originally called The Confederacy and featured Civil War reenactments, including performances representing the execution of a captured Union spy. Wynne originally intended to name the park "Texas Under Six Flags." Various legends have attributed the name change to his wife Joann; a group called "The Daughters of The Texas Republic" — of which his wife may, or may not, have been a member; or his entertainment director, Charles Meeker, stating that, "Texas isn’t 'under' anything."

United States
The USA area of the park opened with the park in 1961. It was originally named the Modern Section, but still represented the United States flag that has flown over Texas. USA also has a kids' sub-section called Bugs Bunny Boomtown.

Bugs Bunny Boomtown
The kid's area of the park originally opened in 1983 as Pac-Man Land. With the introduction of Looney Tunes characters to the park, it was renamed to Looney Tunes Land around 1985. In 2001, the area was renamed once again when it was expanded to include new attractions. It was renamed Bugs Bunny Boomtown for 2014.

Goodtimes Square
Goodtimes Square opened in 1973 along with Mayor H.R. Pufnstuf and The Sid & Marty Krofft Superstars at that time. But over the years it took on a loose 1950's theme.

Gotham City

Gotham City opened in 1999 and is themed to the DC Comics Batman universe.

Boomtown
The Boomtown section opened in 1963. It is based on the Texas boomtowns that sprung up in Texas during the oil boom era.

Tower

The Tower Section opened in 1969 and is named after the Oil Derrick tower location in the section.

Future attractions

Former attractions

References

External links

 Six Flags Over Texas official website

Amusement rides lists